Myrcia adunca is a species of plant in the family Myrtaceae. It is endemic to eastern Cuba.

References

Endemic flora of Cuba
adunca
Endangered plants
Taxonomy articles created by Polbot